Update Korona (English: Corona Updates) is an Indonesian news program which broadcast on Kompas TV. This program is about the Coronavirus pandemic, which entered Indonesia in March 2, 2020.

References

External links 
 
 

Indonesian-language television shows
Indonesian television news shows
2020s Indonesian television series debuts
2020s Indonesian television series
Kompas TV original programming